Lophocampa modesta is a moth of the family Erebidae. It was described by William Forsell Kirby in 1892. It is found in Costa Rica, Panama, Suriname, Ecuador, Bolivia, Peru and Venezuela.

Description
In 1901 George Hampson described the species as follows:

The wingspan for the males is 36–40 mm and the female was measured at 46 mm.

References

 

modesta
Moths described in 1892